Clinton Township is one of the fourteen townships of Shelby County, Ohio, United States.  The 2000 census found 20,903 people in the township, 1,223 of whom lived in the unincorporated portions of the township.

Geography
Located in the southern part of the county, it borders the following townships:
Franklin Township - north
Salem Township - northeast
Perry Township - east
Orange Township - south
Washington Township - southwest
Turtle Creek Township - northwest

Most of Clinton Township is occupied by the city of Sidney, the county seat of Shelby County.

Name
Clinton Township was organized in 1825. It is one of seven Clinton Townships statewide.

Government
The township is governed by a three-member board of trustees, who are elected in November of odd-numbered years to a four-year term beginning on the following January 1. Two are elected in the year after the presidential election and one is elected in the year before it. There is also an elected township fiscal officer, who serves a four-year term beginning on April 1 of the year after the election, which is held in November of the year before the presidential election. Vacancies in the fiscal officership or on the board of trustees are filled by the remaining trustees.

References

External links
County website

Townships in Shelby County, Ohio
Townships in Ohio